The badminton men's team tournament at the 2018 Asian Games took place from 19 to 22 August at the Istora Gelora Bung Karno in Jakarta. The draw for the team event was held on 16 August.

South Korea team was the gold medalist in the last edition of the Asian Games in Incheon 2014, and this time China's team led the seeding.

China won the gold medal after defeating second-seed and host Indonesia 3–1 in the final. Japan and Chinese Taipei shared the bronze medal after losing in the semi-finals.

Schedule
All times are Western Indonesia Time (UTC+07:00)

Results
Legend
WO — Won by walkover

Round of 16

Quarterfinals

Semifinals

Gold medal match

Non-participating athletes

References

External links
Schedule

Men's Team